ARMCX5 is an armadillo repeat–containing protein that is encoded by the X-linked ARMCX5 gene. It is conserved only in Eutheria, a specific group of placental mammals, but no further back in evolutionary time. ARMCX5 contains 3 ARM-like repeats, DUF364, and ARM-type fold.

Features

Splice Variants
ARMCX5 has 6 splice variants.

ORTHOLOGS
ARMCX5 has ten orthologs.

Paralogs
ARMCX5 has 8 paralogs listed by genecards: GPRASP2, ARMCX1, BHLHB9, ARMCX2, GPRASP1, ARMCX6, ARMCX10, and ARMCX3.

Function
Proteins containing this ARMCX5 domain interact with numerous other proteins.  Through these interactions, they are involved in a wide variety of processes including carcinogenesis, control of cellular ageing and survival, regulation f circadian rhythm and lysosomal sorting of G-protein coupled receptors.

Because DUF364 contains a PLP-dependent transferase-like fold, the genomic context suggests that it may have a role in  anaerobic vitamin B12 biosynthesis.

Expression
ARMCX5 is a highly ubiquitously expressed gene that has shown expression in many tissues.

References

Genes on human chromosome X
Armadillo-repeat-containing proteins